Devonport Airport  is a regional airport serving Devonport, a city in the Australian state of Tasmania. The airport is operated by the Tasmanian Ports Corporation (Tasports), which previously operated the larger Hobart International Airport.

History 
In late 1990, the airport was being served by East West Airlines.

Facilities 

Airlines and destinations

Statistics 

Devonport Airport was ranked 40th in Australia for the number of revenue passengers served in financial year 2010–2011.

See also 
 List of airports in Tasmania

References

External links
Official site

Airports in Tasmania
Devonport, Tasmania